Friedrich Karl Gustav Freiherr von Langenau, Imperial Field Marshal-Lieutenant, (7 November 1782, in Dresden - 4 July 1840 Gratz) was Quartermaster-General of the Grand Army of Bohemia, in 1814, and Austrian Army of the Upper Rhine, under Schwarzenberg in 1815.

Early life 
He was the son of a Saxon lieutenant General, Gottlob Bernhard.  He joined at the age of 13 years in the Saxon army, as a Unterleutnant, in the "Kurfürst" Infantry Regiment.  He participated in the campaigns of 1796 to 1812, including the Battle of Saalfeld.  Notably, in the Russian Campaign in 1812, he was head of the General Staff of the VII (Saxon) Corps. After the return of the Saxon Corps from Russia, the King appointed him Adjutant-General. 

In 1813 he negotiated a treaty for mutual defence with Austria; but after the Battle of Lützen (1813), the king of Saxony returned to the French fold at Dresden. Langenau resigned and fought for Austria.  On 27 July 1813, Langenau was Major General to the General Staff.  At Dresden, 26 August 1813, he was successful taking command from the wounded Major General v. Frierenberger.  In Leipzig, 16 October 1813, Feldm. Director-Lieut. Reisner gave direction to Langerau of the Center and the left wing batteries, united at two points, and silenced the enemy guns.  On 18 October Langerau was the first to pursue the withdrawal of the enemy from the Wachau Valley.  Langerau commanded artillery in battles near Hochheim (on 9 November 1813).  His service as Quartermaster-General of the Grand Army of Bohemia, in 1814, and of the Rhine Army, in 1815, under Schwarzenberg, won him universal recognition.  Joseph Radetzky von Radetz served under him in 1814.

Langernau in 1817, became a Brigadier General in Linz.  In 1827 he was appointed Feldmarschall-Lieutenant and assumed command in Frankfurt.  In 1835, he was appointed General in command, Illyria, Tyrol and intraday Austria, in which position he died at Gratz, Austria.

Political 
He was Austrian Plenipotentiary, and the Chairman of  the Military Central Commission of the German Federal Assembly at Frankfurt am Main, from November 1818 to 1829.

Family 
He married Sarah von Sturtz (d. 1851).

Awards 
 Military Maria Theresian Order – KC: 1815
 Order of Leopold – CC: 10.1813
 Military Honor Cross 1813/14 (Army Cross 1813/14): ~ 1814
 Colonel-Proprietor of the Infantry Regiment N°49: 1824 – 04.07.1840
 I.R. Privy Councillor: 1833
 I.R. Chamberlain

France
Order of Military Merit – CC: 1816
Order of the Légion d'Honneur – KC: 1812

Hessen-Darmstadt
Order of Ludwig – GC: 1829

Prussia
Order of the Red Eagle 1st cl.: 1824

Russia
Order of St. Anne 1st cl.: 1813

Saxony
Military Order of St. Henry – CC: before 1829

References 
Notes

Bibliography
 "The German war in 1813 after Osterreichs candidate"  Wurzbach, Biographical Dictionary 2c  14. Bd, Vienna 18 (z5. Shepherd Field, The Military Maria Theresia Order 1c., Wien18s7.
 Sck1weigerd, Austria hero and military leader, s. Bd, Vienna 1854
 campaigns of Suchstn 1812 and 1813 2e., Dresden 1821
 radio, memories from the campaign of the subjects. ec Corps. in the year 1812, Dresden, the 1829
 Saxony and its warriors 1812 and 1813, Leipzig 1822).
 History of the Saxon army 1c., Leipzig, 1858
 Mittheilungen from the paper of a Saxon statesman. Camenz the 1858
 Relation of the war, 22 to 30 August 1813 at Dresden and Kulm, Vienna 18rz. Hiller, memories from the Frriheitskriegen, Stuttgart  1864
 Prokesch-memorabilia from the life of the FM. Fst. Karl Schwarzenberg, Vienna 1828
 Heller, k. k. The Austrian FM. Gi. Radetzky, Stuttgart and Augsburg, 1858 Schinzler.

External links 
 Allgemeine Deutsche Biographie: Langenau, Friedrich Karl Gustav Freiherr von
 Friedrich Karl Gustav Freiherr von Langenau

Field marshals of Austria
Barons of Austria
1782 births
1840 deaths